Fascinated may refer to:

 "Fascinated" (Company B song), 1987
 "Fascinated" (FreeSol song), 2011
 "Fascinated" (Ivy song), 2011
 Fascinated (Rick Ross song)

See also
 Fascination (disambiguation)